Helix is a steel roller coaster located at Liseberg in Gothenburg, Sweden. The ride, built by Mack Rides, features two linear synchronous motor launches and has a top speed of 100 km/h (62 mph). It features a  dual-launch helix. The ride opened on 26 April 2014, Liseberg's opening date for the 2014 season. Helix is the first roller coaster in the world that has a 1-on-1 replica virtual reality experience. This experience is created by ArchiVision, a Dutch 3D studio. During the first two weeks after the premiere visitors could experience the virtual reality replica next to the roller coaster's entrance. 

The roller coaster's station building is located where the 3D cinema Maxxima used to be, by the foot of the tower AtmosFear. The  track follows the hillside in a custom-made track design. The elements during the ride include two corkscrews, a pretzel knot, a top hat, a zero-g roll, and a rare Norwegian loop.
The estimated cost for the project is about 239,000,000 Swedish kronor.

History
In October 2012, Liseberg announced that they would be adding a new attraction for the 2014 season. The park hired Mack Rides to build a multi-launch roller coaster with a terrain layout. It would be codenamed Projekt Helix.

Vertical construction of Helix began in October 2013 when the supports were built on a rocky hill.

Helix opened on 26 April 2014.

Photos

References

External links

Official ride website
OnRide POV

Liseberg
Roller coasters in Sweden
Articles containing video clips